Rosario Lauture (born 9 August 1976) is a Haitian football player, who currently plays as a goalkeeper and goalkeeping coach for Violette AC in First Division of Haiti, and has played for the Haiti national team.

References

1976 births
Living people
Haitian footballers
Haiti international footballers
Association football goalkeepers